Latymer Upper School is a co-educational public school in Hammersmith, London, England, between King Street and the River Thames. It derives from a charity school founded in 1624 by the English merchant Edward Latymer, which has existed continually since. With approximately 1,200 pupils, most students are admitted to the Upper School through examination and interview at the age of eleven, with some also entering into the Sixth Form at 16. The school's academic results place it among the top schools nationally, and it has historically accepted under 10% of applicants.

Having moved to its present site in 1863, the school spent a period of time in the mid-20th century as a direct grant grammar school, before becoming independent with the system's abolition in the 1970s. Remaining single-sex until 1996, when Sixth Form admissions were opened to girls, the school transitioned to full co-education in the first decade of the 21st century.

Latymer has been consistently ranked among the leading schools in the country academically. Its list of alumni include diplomats, numerous former and current members of both Houses of Parliament, the winners of several Olympic medals, and many prominent figures in the arts and sciences.

History

Origins 

Latymer Upper School was founded in 1624 by Edward Latymer, a wealthy lawyer and puritan, who left part of his wealth for the clothing and education of "eight poore boyes" from Hammersmith. For the next twenty years, local boys were educated in a school erected in Fulham's churchyard, moving in 1648 to another school built in Hammersmith. Later, in 1657, a parochial charity school was set up, which served as the Latymer legacy for the following century until it was rebuilt in 1755.

A new facility was built on what is now King Street in Hammersmith in 1863, and was replaced in 1890 with a new building between King Street and the Thames. This structure persists to the present day as the core of the Upper School. The site also includes Latymer Prep, a preparatory school, which takes pupils aged 7 to 11.

Recent history 
In the 1950s, the school was a direct grant grammar school, which took large numbers of state school pupils, whose fees were paid by the local authority, solely on the basis of merit. At the same time, it continued to take some fee-paying pupils. The Direct Grant system was abolished from 1975, and the school became fully independent of government funding.

The Sixth Form has been co-educational since 1996, and in 2004 the main school started to become co-educational, with the introduction of girls into Year 7. With that year's entry moving into Year 11, the school became fully co-educational by 2008.

Each year, the school gathers in the nearby St. Paul's church for "Founder's Day", an annual reflection upon and celebration of Edward Latymer and other beneficiaries of the school.

As a member school of the HMC it is a public school.

Student body 
Pupils come from a wide area of London. 176 pupils are on means-tested bursaries, 70 of whom are on 100 percent bursaries. A school statement in the Good Schools Guide said: "We attract a real mix from city investors, media types and academics living in leafy streets through to families on the White City estate, which is surely better than just those from a privileged bubble mixing with each other".

Finances 

Tuition for 2020 was £21,000 per year, plus other mandatory and optional fees.

Latymer offers a bursary programme, with 176 pupils on means-tested bursaries. For families with incomes unable to pay the fees, Latymer Upper is free. The school has a substantial fund from donations ring-fenced to fund bursaries.

Academics 

Latymer Upper School is one of the highest academically performing schools in the UK historically and to date.  The school's own on-site prep pupils enter the Upper School automatically at the end of Year 6, Tatler Schools Guide commentated that 'competition for Latymer places is hotter than ever: 1,100 applicants sat the exam last spring; 400 were interviewed for 168 places'. The examined subjects are in English and Maths, which are followed by an interview. There were 33 Oxbridge places in 2017, and an increasing number went to US universities such as Brown, Columbia, Dartmouth, Harvard, Princeton, Stanford, Pennsylvania and Yale, and other universities.

Activities
There are over 140 clubs and societies at Latymer, including the J. S. Mill, Literary and Latymer Societies. There are also clubs for bridge, chess, debating, philosophy and photography. The Drama Society holds several productions each year. Two students in Year 10 won the International Debating Competition in Cambridge at their age level. The final consisted of four other London-based schools that included St Paul's and Westminster.

The school has links with other schools across Europe with a joint orchestra, as well as other trips (such as work experience), with Godolphin and Latymer School. There are trips abroad throughout the year, such as skiing trips, language exchanges, work experience in Paris, Berlin and Stockholm, Classics trips to Italy and Greece, sports tours and expeditions. Latymer Upper also participates in the Duke of Edinburgh Award scheme.

Latymer contributes to local music, art, drama, dance and sports projects, as well as acting as venue for a Sunday School and Scuba diving for the disabled. Sixth Form students are encouraged to help in local primary schools and old people's homes as part of their general studies program, as well as with groups helping the homeless and disabled. In addition, the school offers all students a trip every year in 'Activities Week'. Destinations have included Spain, the Ardèche gorge in the south of France.

Sports & Athletics 
The PE department offer extracurricular programmes. Optional sports include rugby, cricket, rowing, athletics, football, tennis, cross-country, fencing, karate, scuba diving, table tennis, squash, badminton and swimming. Over 700 students are currently learning to play a musical instrument, with 175 involved in the school's two full orchestras and five string orchestras and around 150 in the choirs.

Rowing 
The Latymer Upper School Boat Club has been open for over a century to school pupils, and offers rowing to both genders. The boat house has taught three Olympic rowers, including Andy Holmes, Olympic gold medal rower (1984 Games and 1988 Games), Henry Fieldman, Olympic bronze medal rower (2020 Games) and the Olympic Silver medallist Jim Clark was a coach. The Boat Club has gone on to win Henley Royal Regatta, most recently with the win of the Diamond Jubilee Challenge Cup.

Facilities

Academic facilities 

 The Main Hall is the primary building around which the rest of the campus is grouped. It is the original Victorian school building, with a main hall in which assemblies are held, and a corridor linking to classes.
 The Design block at one end of the main hall houses the Design & Technology labs.
 The Modern languages block is a 1960s building housing the modern and classical languages departments.
 The Latymer Theatre and Arts Centre, opened in 2000, includes a 300-seat galleried box theatre, music practice rooms, art galleries and studios, plus a cafe and atrium area.
 The Latymer Performing Arts Centre, completed in 2009, contains drama studios, rehearsal rooms and a 150-seat recital hall.
 The Science and Library building, opened in 2010, includes labs for the three sciences and a library with seating for more than 200 pupils which occupies a floor at the base. Van Heyningen and Haward Architects were responsible for the design and delivery of these four buildings during a ten-year working relationship with the school.
 Outbuildings house history and geography lessons, as well as the arts.

150 computers are provided for pupil use, networked and with e-mail and internet access, and ICT is taught in one lesson a week in Years 7 to 9. Pupils are permitted to cycle to school, with storage space provided for their bikes. Meals are self-service in the lunch hall, and there is a café in the "atrium".

Athletic facilities 

 The Latymer Upper School boat club faces the Thames and spans four stories.
 The Sports Centre was opened in March 2016, which includes a six-lane swimming pool, basketball hoops, badminton markings, cricket nets, a fitness suite, and a rock climbing wall whilst at the same time offering an area for all pupils to take their examinations.
 The school's playing fields are about a mile and a half away, on Wood Lane, with a £2m sports pavilion and changing rooms completed in 2004. The playing fields are used for training by the England Rugby Team
 The Sports pavilion, costing £2m and containing changing rooms was opened in 2004.

Other facilities 

 The chapel is housed at the top of the Geography & History building.

Coat of arms

The school for many years used the armorial bearings of the founder, Edward Latymer.  This included his motto, paulatim ergo certe ("Slowly therefore surely"), which doubled as a pun, including the word "latimer" (spelt thus as there is no letter y in Latin). An intermediate coat of arms was taken from one of the quarters of the original coat of arms which combined that of the Latymer Foundation and of the Latymer School. In 2004, the motto was simplified, before being changed again to its current form in September 2020. The original arms continue to be used, with a different motto, by the sister school, The Latymer School.

Public examination results 
Latymer has been ranked consistently in the leading schools in the country academically based on the merit of its position in the national GCSE and A level examination performance tables combined with one of the highest Oxford and Cambridge acceptance rates of any secondary school or college.

GCSE & A-Level summaries over five years

Old Latymerians

Politics 

 John Beckett (1894-1964), dissident politician
 Norman Blackwell, businessman and politician
 Peter Hendy, Chairman of Network Rail
 Alan Hunt, former British High Commissioner to Singapore
 John Killick, former British Ambassador to Moscow
 Ian Percival, former Solicitor General
 Joshua Rozenberg, legal affairs correspondent for the Daily Telegraph
 Andy Slaughter, Labour MP for Hammersmith
 Keith Vaz, former Labour MP for Leicester East
 Peter Walker, former Conservative Cabinet Minister
 Larry Whitty, former Labour Party General Secretary
 George Walden, former Conservative Party Education Minister

Film and Theatre

 William Hinds (1887–1957), jeweller and one time owner of Hammer Productions film studios 
 Jessie Cave, actress
 Lily Cole, actress and model
 Hugh Grant, actor
 Martyn Green, actor-singer, comedian
 Christopher Guard, actor
 Natalie Abrahami, theatre director
 Ophelia Lovibond, actress
 Imogen Poots, actress
 Augustus Prew, actor
 Toby Regbo, actor
 Alan Rickman, actor
 Mel Smith, actor, comedian, film director, producer, writer
 Sean Teale, actor
 Will Theakston, actor
 Alix Wilton Regan, actress
 Rufus Jones, actor
 Gordon McDougall, theatre director and academic

Music

 Dom & Roland, drum & bass DJ/producer
 Ralph Hill, music critic
 Ils, electronic music producer and DJ
 Walter Legge, record producer and classical impresario
 Matrix
 Joshua Lloyd-Watson and Tom McFarland, core members of Jungle
 Charlie Morgan, Tom Robinson Band and composer of theme tune to The Bill
 Optical, drum & bass DJ/producer and Matrix's older brother
 Arlo Parks, singer
 Jay Sean, singer
 Cliff Townshend, jazz musician, expelled from Latymer, father of Pete
 Raphael Wallfisch, cellist

Sport

 Andy Holmes, Olympic gold medal rower
 Antony Hooper, cricketer
 Simon Hughes, cricketer
 Hugh Jones, London Marathon winner
 Dan Luger, rugby player
 Dominic Waldouck, rugby player

Other fields 

 Richard Jackson, Bishop of Hereford
 Natalie Abrahami, theatre director
 Heston Blumenthal, TV chef and owner of The Fat Duck
 Ajahn Brahm, Buddhist monk
 Ed Condry, Bishop of Ramsbury
 Thomas Haller Cooper, member of the Waffen SS's British Free Corps
 Jason Da Costa, Flight Simulation
 Bill Emmott, former editor of The Economist
 Sir Andrew Haines – Director of the London School of Hygiene & Tropical Medicine
 Harold Spencer Jones, Astronomer Royal 
 Hilary Jones, GMTV in-house doctor
 Milton Jones, comedian
 Giles Milton, author and journalist
 Philip I. Murray, professor of Ophthalmology at the University of Birmingham, United Kingdom
 Tim Moore, travel writer
 John D. Ray, Egyptologist
 Jerry Roberts, wartime codebreaker at Bletchley Park
 David Shoenberg, physicist, researcher into supercooling
 Eric Simms, natural history broadcaster
 Sir Jim Smith, scientist
 Nicholas Stern, ex-Chief Economist of the World Bank and author of the Stern Review on climate change
 Allegra Stratton, journalist
 Deyan Sudjic, Director, Design Museum, London 
 Zbigniew Szydlo, historian of chemistry
 Ibrahim Taguri, community worker
 David Tress, painter
 Fred Vine, geologist and co-discoverer of plate tectonics
 Adrian Weale, writer and historian
 Roger Westman, architect

 Gordon Brook-Shepherd, author

Notable former staff
Jim Clark, rowing coach
Alastair Heathcote
 Peter Jacobs, piano
Max Kenworthy, taught music
Robert King (conductor), taught music
Shaun Sutton
Jean Driant, taught French

See also
 1620s in England
 Godolphin and Latymer School
 The Latymer School, situated in Edmonton, which was also covered by Latymer's bequest.
 Gelehrtenschule des Johanneums (twinned school)

Notes

References

External links

Latymer Upper's official website
Latymer Prep School's official website
Official Old Latymerian website
Latymer Upper at the UK Schools Guide
A summary of Latymer Upper's academic performance
A detailed history of the Latymer schools at British History Online

1624 establishments in England
Latymer School
Private co-educational schools in London
Latymer Upper School
Member schools of the Headmasters' and Headmistresses' Conference